Shukhevych or Shukhevich (Ukrainian or Russian: Шухевич, Belarusian: Шухевiч) is a gender-neutral East Slavic surname. Notable people with this surname include:

Roman Shukhevych (1907–1950), Ukrainian politician and military leader
Stepan Shukhevych (1877–1945), Ukrainian lawyer and military figure
Volodymyr Shukhevych (1849–1915), Ukrainian writer, ethnographer and teacher
Yuriy Shukhevych (born 1933), Ukrainian politician

East Slavic-language surnames